Panner may refer to:

 Israel Panner (1909–1973), Austrian/British journalist
 Owen M. Panner (1924-2018), American judge
 Gold-panner, a person who engages in panning for gold
 Palfuria panner, a spider species of the family Zodariidae
 Panner disease, an orthopedic disease of the elbow

See also
 Paneer, a fresh cheese
 Panning (disambiguation)